Pyar Jung Thapa was Chief of Army Staff (COAS) of Nepalese Army from 10 September 2003 to 9 September 2006 A.D during the Maoist insurgency. In 2006 A.D, he had discussed with Girija Prasad Koirala about opting out from the position of COAS for Rookmangud Katawal. Later, Rookmangud succeeded Thapa.

Thapa has faced alleged human right violation claims. He was investigated by Commission for the Investigation of Abuse of Authority for abusing government funds during People's Movement-II (Jana Aandolan-II). He was criticized for oppressing pro-democracy agitators. He was also accused of using excessive security forces that resulted in death of 21 people during the protest. However, he later took initiative to negotiate with Seven Party Alliance (SPA) to quell down the distress.

He is connected to Gaekwad dynasty by marriage of his daughter Pragyashree Thapa to Pratapsinh Sangramsinh Gaekwad, grandson of former King of Baroda: Pratap Singh Rao Gaekwad.

Thapa holds the view that Nepal should be a Hindu State. He believes that Hinduism is the thread that has tied Nepalese people during the times of crisis. He has also said the major political parties have committed an error by not holding a referendum to decide whether or not Nepal should be a Hindu State. He also believes that the Nepali Constitution was rushed; the major parties should have meet halfway with Madhesi people.

References

External links

|-

Year of birth missing (living people)
Living people
Nepalese military personnel
People of the Nepalese Civil War